Retinitus is an extinct genus of flies in the family Dolichopodidae. It contains only one species, Retinitus nervosus, from the Upper Cretaceous of the Taymyr Peninsula in Russia. The generic name comes from "retinite" (fossil resin), and the specific name comes from the Latin word nervus.

References

†
†
†
Prehistoric Diptera genera
Late Cretaceous insects